Jo Sol-song (born 27 October 1995) is a North Korean footballer who currently plays as a forward for Pyongyang SC.

Career statistics

International

References

External links
 

1995 births
Living people
North Korean footballers
North Korea international footballers
North Korea youth international footballers
Association football forwards
Pyongyang Sports Club players